Colored Lights: The Broadway Album is the eighth studio album by American singer-songwriter Debbie Gibson. Released on October 28, 2003 on the Fynsworth Alley label, it includes songs from nine pre-existing theatre musicals and one from her own original theatre musical Skirts.

Track listing

Personnel 
Ron Abel – Conductor, Keyboards, producer, Orchestration, Musical Director
Greg Arnold's Tricycle – Mastering
Mike Brewer – Assistant
Ruth Bruegger – Violin
Debra Byrd – Background vocals
Mark Converse – Percussion, Drums
Phillip D. Feather – Reeds
Dan Fornero – Trumpet
John Fumo – Trumpet
Ray "The Closer" Garcia – Background vocals
Chris Gehringer – Mastering
Grant Geissman – Guitar
Debbie Gibson – Producer
Jesse Gorman – Assistant Engineer
Mark Hollingsworth – Reeds
John Krovozc – Cello
Randy Landas – Bass
Sylvia MacCalla – Background vocals
Joan Marcus – Photography
Jean Marinelli – French Horn
William Meade – Producer
Kevin Merrill – Photography
Lanny Meyers – Orchestration
Ilene Novog – Viola
Cheryl Ongaro – Violin
Steve Orich – Keyboards, Orchestration
Vladimir Polimatidi – Violin
Alex Rannie – Harp
Gabe Sganga – Assistant Engineer
Jerry Sharell – Background vocals
David Stout – Trombone
Chris Tergesen – Engineer
Mark Wilder – Mastering
Michael Yuen – Art Direction, Package Design

References

External links
 
 
 

Colored Lights: The Broadway Album
Colored Lights: The Broadway Album
Covers albums